The Irish Famine Memorial, also known as the Irish Famine Monument, is installed in Cambridge Common, in Cambridge, Massachusetts, United States. The monument was designed by Maurice Harrow, and dedicated by Ireland President Mary Robinson in July 1997.

Description 
On one side of the memorial is written "AN GORTA MÓR - THE GREAT HUNGER", "IRELAND 1845-1850" along with the dedication and on the other: "NEVER AGAIN SHOULD A PEOPLE STARVE IN A WORLD OF PLENTY".

See also

 1997 in art
 List of memorials to the Great Famine

References

External links
 Irish Famine Monument, Cambridge Office for Tourism
 Irish Famine Monument – Cambridge, MA at Waymarking

1997 establishments in Massachusetts
1997 sculptures
Great Famine (Ireland) monuments and memorials
Monuments and memorials in Massachusetts
Outdoor sculptures in Cambridge, Massachusetts
Sculptures of children in the United States
Sculptures of men in Massachusetts
Sculptures of women in Massachusetts
Statues in Massachusetts